SCBC may refer to:

 Somerville College Boat Club
 Selwyn College Boat Club
 South Carolina Baptist Convention
 Sudan Catholic Bishops' Conference
 Supreme Court of British Columbia
 ICAO code for Cacique Blanco Airport